The 1974 City of Dundee District Council election took place on 8 May 1974 to elect members of City of Dundee Council, as part of that years Scottish local elections.

Election results

References

1974
1974 Scottish local elections
20th century in Dundee